This is a list of sovereign states in the 1960s, giving an overview of states around the world during the period between 1 January 1960 and 31 December 1969. It contains 165 entries, arranged alphabetically, with information on the status and recognition of their sovereignty. It includes 143 widely-recognized sovereign states, 2 constituent republics of another sovereign state that were UN members on their own right, 7 associated states, and 11 entities which were de facto sovereign (and 1 nominally independent puppet state) but which were not widely-recognized by other states.

Sovereign states

Other entities
Excluded from the list above are the following noteworthy entities which either were not fully sovereign or did not claim to be independent:
Antarctica as a whole had no government and no permanent population. Seven states claimed portions of Antarctica and five of these had reciprocally recognised one another's claims. These claims, which were regulated by the Antarctic Treaty System (from 23 June 1961), were neither recognised nor disputed by any other signatory state.
  was incorporated into the Soviet Union in 1940, but the legality of the annexation was not widely-recognized. The Baltic diplomatic services in the West continued to be recognised as representing the de jure state.
  was incorporated into the Soviet Union in 1940, but the legality of the annexation was not widely-recognized. The Baltic diplomatic services in the West continued to be recognised as representing the de jure state.
  was incorporated into the Soviet Union in 1940, but the legality of the annexation was not widely-recognized. The Baltic diplomatic services in the West continued to be recognised as representing the de jure state.
 The Saudi–Iraqi neutral zone was a strip of neutral territory between Iraq and Saudi Arabia.
 The Saudi–Kuwaiti neutral zone was a strip of neutral territory between Kuwait and Saudi Arabia (to 18 December 1969).
  The Sovereign Military Order of Malta was an entity claiming sovereignty. The order had bi-lateral diplomatic relations with a large number of states, but had no territory other than extraterritorial areas within Rome. The order's Constitution stated: "The Order is a subject of international law and exercises sovereign functions." Although the order frequently asserted its sovereignty, it did not claim to be a sovereign state. It lacked a defined territory. Since all its members were citizens of other states, almost all of them lived in their native countries, and those who resided in the order's extraterritorial properties in Rome did so only in connection with their official duties, the order lacked the characteristic of having a permanent population.
  West Berlin was a political enclave that was closely aligned with – but not actually a part of – West Germany. It consisted of three occupied sectors administered by the United States, the United Kingdom, and France.
  West New Guinea (West Irian) was a transitional non-independent territory governed by the United Nations. It was neither sovereign nor under the sovereignty of any other state. It was established on 1 October 1962 over the former Netherlands New Guinea colony and became a province of Indonesia on 1 May 1963.

See also
List of sovereign states by year
List of state leaders in 1960
List of state leaders in 1961
List of state leaders in 1962
List of state leaders in 1963
List of state leaders in 1964
List of state leaders in 1965
List of state leaders in 1966
List of state leaders in 1967
List of state leaders in 1968
List of state leaders in 1969

Notes

References

1960-1969
1960s politics-related lists
1960 in international relations
1961 in international relations
1962 in international relations
1963 in international relations
1964 in international relations
1965 in international relations
1966 in international relations
1967 in international relations
1968 in international relations
1969 in international relations